The Uganda National Medical Stores, commonly referred to as  National Medical Stores (NMS), is a government-owned organisation in Uganda, mandated to procure, store and distribute human medication and health-related consumable items to government-owned health units in all  districts of Uganda.

Location
The coordinates of the head office are 0°03'49.0"N, 32°28'13.0"E (Latitude:0.063611; Longitude:32.470278). It was reported in Ugandan media in May 2018, that NMS would re-locate its headquarters from Entebbe to Kajjansi, upon the completion of construction of the new logistics center at the new location in 2019.

National Medical Stores maintains regional offices at the following locations:

 Entebbe Head Office: Entebbe,  Central Uganda  
 Arua Regional Office: Arua, West Nile    
 Gulu Regional Office: Gulu, Northern Uganda
 Hoima Regional Office: Hoima, Western Uganda
 Kabarole Regional Office: Fort Portal, Western Uganda 
 Kampala Regional Office: Kampala,  Buganda Region  
 Mbale Regional Office: Mbale,  Eastern Uganda 
 Mbarara Regional Office: Mbarara, Western Uganda
 Moroto Regional Office: Moroto, Northern Uganda
 Soroti Regional Office: Soroti,  Eastern Uganda 

The agency works in collaboration with the Uganda Ministry of Health and all healthcare facilities, including Health Centers IIs, IIIs and IVs, General Hospitals, Regional Referral Hospitals and National Referral Hospitals.

Overview
NMS was created by the Ugandan legislature in 1993.

Governance
The agency is governed by a 15-person board of directors, which serves for a four-year renewable term. Its members include the following individuals, effective August 2018. (1) Jotham Musinguzi: Chairman (2) Medard Bitekyerezo (3) Hanifah Namaala Sengendo (4) Samuel Orochi (5) Justinian Niwagaba (6) Laban Mbulamuko (7) Kenneth Omoding (8) Kate Nalukenge (9) Naome Kibaaju (10) Christine Ondoa (11) Richard Mugahi (12) Emmanuel Osuna (13) Beatrice Lagaba (14) Shaban Abdullah and (15) Timothy Musila.

Kajjansi Logistics Centre

The new warehouse is partly funded by the Global Fund, which has contributed US$7.6 million and by the GAVI international vaccination initiative, which contributed US$1.5 million. Completion was slated for June 2019.

In November 2018, GAVI approved US$5.6 million (USh:21 billion) and the Uganda government committed USh:20 billion (US$5.4 million) towards the construction of the facility. At the time of its commissioning, Ugandan media reported that the warehouse and office complex cost USh:69 billion (approx. US$18.5 million) to construct. 

The warehouse will have a vaccine workshop, a quality control laboratory, offices for more than 200 staff, cold storage rooms, garages and space to accommodate 30,000 pallets of medication. In comparison, the storage in Entebbe can accommodate a maximum of only 12,980 pallets.

See also
 Economy of Uganda
 Uganda Joint Medical Store
 Quality Chemical Industries Limited
 National Food and Drug Authority

References

External links

Global Fund gives Sh70b for Medical Stores warehouse As of 20 March 2017.
 President Museveni Commissions New National Medical Stores Complex As of 4 November 2022.

Organizations established in 1993
Organisations based in Entebbe
1993 establishments in Uganda
Medical and health organisations based in Uganda